Assistant Commissioner in Bangladesh is the entry level post of field administration of the Administrative Service of Bangladesh. It is also the entry level rank of the officer of Customs, Excise and VAT. The equivalent rank for the police is Assistant Superintendent of Police. To join as an Assistant Commissioner, a person has to pass three phases of the Bangladesh Civil Service exam, and get recommendation form the Bangladesh Public Service Commission, a constitutional body of Bangladesh. An Assistant Commissioner of the administration also acts as an Executive Magistrate and can exercise vast executive and limited judicial power in their respective jurisdiction.

References

Bangladeshi civil servants